Huddersfield Town's 1935–36 campaign was a season that saw Town emulate their successes in the mid-1920s, by finishing the season in third place. They achieved the same number of points as second placed Derby County, but finished eight points behind champions Sunderland.

Squad at the start of the season

Review
Town's form dramatically improved from the disappointing 16th place the previous season. The season did not have many big highlights with the exception of the third-place finish, although their position might have been even higher if Charlie Luke had not been transferred to Sheffield Wednesday and Alf Lythgoe had not had his leg injury which kept him out for the last three months.

Squad at the end of the season

Results

Division One

FA Cup

Appearances and goals

1935–36
English football clubs 1935–36 season